St Brendan's GAA may refer to:

St Brendan's Board GAA, a divisional team in County Kerry
St Brendan's GAA (Dublin), a sports club in Grangegorman, Ireland
St Brendan's GAA (Galway), a hurling club in Ballygar, Ireland
St Brendan's GAA (Waterford), a group of Gaelic football clubs, based in east County Waterford, Ireland
St Brendan's Hurling Club, a hurling club in Ardfert, County Kerry

See also
St Brendan's GFC (London), a sports club in England
St Brendan's Hurling Club, a sports club in the Ardfert area of north County Kerry, Ireland